The following is a list of translators primarily translating literary works in the Arabic language into English editions that have been published in print. The leading prizes in this field of translation are the Banipal Prize and the Arkansas Arabic Translation Award.

A
Farouk Abdel Wahab
Leila Abouzeid
Kareem James Abu-Zeid
Abdallah M. Altaiyeb
Sinan Antoon
A. J. Arberry
Albakry Mohammed 
Forster Fitzgerald Arbuthnot
Omran Akasha

B
Adil Babikir
Aida Bamia
Joseph Bell
Sophie Bennett
Marilyn Booth
Keith Bosley
Angele Botros Samaan
Issa J. Boullata
Sargon Boulus
Paul Bowles
Leon Carl Brown
Richard Francis Burton

C
Anthony Calderbank
Yigal Carmon
Catherine Cobham
Thomas Cleary
Elliot Colla
Miriam Cooke
Michael Cooperson
Robyn Creswell

D
Humphrey T. Davies
N. J. Dawood

E
Abba Eban

F
Nicole Fares
Ahmed Fathy
Elizabeth Fernea
Bassam Frangieh

G
Ferial Ghazoul
Sayed Gouda
William Granara
William Alexander Greenhill

H
Marilyn Hacker
Hala Halim
Stuart A. Hancox
Nay Hannawi
Yasmeen Hanoosh
Michelle Hartman
Paula Haydar
Samuel Hazo
Sherif Hetata
Sawad Hussain
William M. Hutchins
Hazem Al-Ali

J
Elisabeth Jaquette
Salma Khadra Jayyusi
Zahra Jhishi
Denys Johnson-Davies
Fady Joudah

K
Reem Kelani

L
Trevor LeGassick
Frances Liardet
 David Larsen, translator of Names of the Lion by Ibn Khalawayh (Wave Books, 2017), winner of the 2018 Harold Landon Morton Award.

M
Khaled al-Masri
Khaled Mattawa
Karen McNeil
James T. Monroe
Ibrahim Muhawi

N
Daniel L. Newman
Amira Nowaira
Osman Nusairi

O
Wen-chin Ouyang

Q

 Tahera Qutbuddin

R
Jeremy Reed
Nancy N. Roberts
Barbara Romaine

S
Ahmad Sadri
Samah Selim
Saadi Simawe
Reuven Snir
Ahdaf Soueif 
Paul Starkey
Raymond Stock

T
Maia Tabet
Peter Theroux
Christopher Tingley

V
John Verlenden

W
Magdi Wahba
Max Weiss
Lisa White
Jonathan Wright

Y
Nariman Youssef

See also
 Banipal Prize for Arabic Literary Translation

References

Arabic-English translators
Literary translators